Perittia junnilaisella is a moth of the family Elachistidae. It is found in Turkey.

References

Moths described in 2009
Elachistidae
Endemic fauna of Turkey
Moths of Asia